The Catholic Church in Turkey is part of the worldwide Catholic Church, under the spiritual leadership of the Pope and the canonical leadership of the curia in Rome that is submitted to the Pope.

Demographics
In the 2000s, there are around 35,000 Catholics, constituting 0.05% of the population. The faithful follow the Latin, Byzantine, Armenian and Chaldean Rites. Most Latin Church Catholics are Levantines of mainly Italian or French background, with a few are ethnic Turks, who are usually either converts via marriage to Levantines or other non-Turkish Catholics, or are returnees from Europe who converted there, and who may often be still registered as Muslim by the government. Byzantine, Armenian, and Chaldean rite Catholics are generally members of the Greek, Armenian, and Assyrian minority groups respectively. Turkey's Catholics are concentrated in Istanbul.

Incidents
The Catholic Christian community was shocked when Father Andrea Santoro, an Italian missionary working in Turkey for 10 years, was shot twice in February 2006 at his church near the Black Sea. He had written a letter to the Pope asking him to visit Turkey. Pope Benedict XVI visited Turkey in November 2006. Relations had been rocky since Pope Benedict XVI had stated his opposition to Turkey joining the European Union. Turkey's Council of Catholic Bishops met with the Turkish prime minister in 2004 to discuss restrictions and difficulties such as property issues. On June 6, 2010, Bishop Luigi Padovese, the Vicar Apostolic of Turkey, was killed.

Organization

 Latin Church: 
Archdiocese of Izmir 
seat in Izmir
Cathedral: St. John's Cathedral, Izmir
Jurisdiction: archdiocese without suffragan dioceses
Apostolic Vicariate of Anatolia 
seat in Iskenderun
Cathedral: Cathedral of the Annunciation, Iskenderun
Co-Cathedral: St. Anthony of Padua Co-Cathedral, Mersin
Jurisdiction: Immediately Subject to the Holy See
Apostolic Vicariate of Istanbul 
seat in Istanbul
Cathedral: Cathedral of the Holy Spirit, Istanbul, Basilica minor
Basilica minor: St. Anthony of Padua Basilica, Istanbul, Istanbul
Jurisdiction: Immediately subject to the Holy See
 Armenian Catholic Church: 
Archeparchy of Istanbul 
seat in Istanbul
Cathedral: Holy Mother of God Armenian Cathedral Church, Istanbul
Jurisdiction: Immediately subject to the Holy See
 Greek Byzantine Catholic Church: 
Apostolic Exarchate of Istanbul 
seat in Istanbul
Cathedral: Holy Trinity Greek Catholic Cathedral, Istanbul (Ayatriada Rum Katoliki Kilise)
Jurisdiction: Immediately subject to the Holy See
 Syriac Catholic Church: 
Exarchate of Turkey 
seat in Istanbul
Cathedral: 
Jurisdiction: Immediately subject to the Syriac Catholic Church
 Chaldean Catholic Church: 
Archdiocese of Diarbekir 
seat in Beyoğlu, Istanbul
Cathedral: St. Mary's Cathedral, Diyarbakır
Jurisdiction: Immediately subject to the Chaldean Catholic Patriarchate of Babylon

See also
Episcopal Conference of Turkey
Christianity in Turkey
List of Saints from Asia
Religious minorities in Turkey

References

External links
The Catholic Church in Turkey by GCatholic.org

 
Turkey
Turkey